Mat Kaplan is an American radio personality. He is the former host of Planetary Radio, a radio talk show about space exploration produced by The Planetary Society.

Career 
Kaplan's extensive background in journalism has ranged from public radio reporter covering political conventions to movie reviewer for an international magazine, as well as a correspondent for a couple of pioneering national TV series about computers. Kaplan has been working in broadcasting since the age of 17. He also worked for 30 years as a technology and media manager for a local university where he oversaw the campus television station.

Personal life 
Kaplan spent most of his career working in Long Beach. He currently lives in San Diego, California, with his wife. He has two adult daughters and one grandson.

See also
Planetary Radio
Planetary Society

References

External links 
 Planetary Radio Website

Living people
Year of birth missing (living people)
American infotainers
American talk radio hosts
Space advocates